Gantang may refer to:

Units of measurement
 Gantang (Basilan), a Basilan measurement
 An Indonesian units of measurement
 A Malay unit of measurement
 A South African unit of measurement

Places in China
 Gantang, Shuangfeng, Hunan
 Gantang, Jingzhou County, Hunan
 A village in Puyi Township, Yunnan
 A village in Huangshan District, Huangshan City, Anhui
 A township in Pingnan County, Fujian
 A town in Fu'an, Ningde, Fujian

Other
 Gantang–Wuwei railway, a railway in China
 Gantang railway station, a station on Gantang–Wuwei railway

See also